Rangrezz is a 2013 Indian Hindi-language action drama film directed by Priyadarshan starring Jackky Bhagnani, Priya Anand, Rajpal Yadav, Vijay Varma and Amitosh Nagpal. The film is an official remake of the 2009 Tamil film Naadodigal. The film was titled by Shah Rukh Khan, who had registered it through his production company Red Chillies Entertainment. The film was produced by Vashu Bhagnani under his production banner Pooja Entertainment India Ltd. Priyadarshan and Santosh Sivan teamed up for this film, after Kaalapani (1996).
The film was released on 21 March 2013.

Cast 
 Jackky Bhagnani as Rishi Deshpande
 Priya Anand as Megha Joshi
 Amitosh Nagpal as Vinod “Vinu”
 Vijay Varma as Pakkya
 Akshara Gowda as Jasmine
 Raaghav Chanana as Joy
 Rishikesh Deshpande as Chacha Chaudhari
 Pankaj Tripathi as Brijbihari Pande
 Lushin Dubey as Rati Chaturvedi
 Sunil Sinha as Devdutta Deshpande
 Sona Nair as Devyani Deshpande
 Sakhi Gokhale as Venu
 Milind Wagh as Major
 Milind Phatak as Carpenter

Release 
The movie released on 21 March 2013, on the festive season of Holi. The film was cleared with a U/A certificate from the CBFC after a total of 18 cuts. The BBFC gave it a 12A rating for moderate violence and gore.

Critical reception 
On release Rangrezz got positive reviews from critics. Ankur Pathak from Rediff.com gave the film 3/5 stars, and said Rangrezz works despite being saddled with a rather clichéd plot. NDTV also similarly rated 3/5, calling it Priyadarshan's "best work in years". Indiaglitz rated it 3.5/5 and stated "Salaam Youngistaan...dil se" Bollywood life rated it 3/5 and said "Priyadarshan's realistic take on friendship is commendable". Bookmyshow also rated it 3/5, calling it "a moderately entertaining masala film skillfully based on traditional Indian values". Filmfare rated it 3/5, thus responding positively. Filmibeat rated the movie 3/5, thus being another positive score for the film. Zee News also similarly rated the movie 3/5, along with a positive verdict. Sify similarly rated it 3/5, along with the statement "Cupid's arrow has never struck a deadlier blow". Daiji World rated the movie 3/5, also responding positively.

Soundtrack 

Three songs are composed by Sajid–Wajid. Tamil composer, Sundar C Babu (who composed for the original Tamil film) makes his debut in Hindi with two songs. Musicperk.com rated the album 7/10 quoting "Another predictable album from Sajid–Wajid". The film also features the song "Gangnam Style", sung by PSY.

Box office

Rangrezz, despite getting positive reviews, did not repeat the same success of Naadodigal. The film had an average opening and collected Rs. 10 million on the first day of its release, along with collecting Rs. 40 million in its opening weekend. The film collected a total of Rs. 6.37 crores in its lifetime run at the box office.

References

External links 
 

2013 films
2010s Hindi-language films
Hindi remakes of Tamil films
Films directed by Priyadarshan
Films scored by Sundar C. Babu
Indian buddy films